The 2014 Season was NorthEast United's 1st season in existence in the Indian Super League.

Background
In early 2014 it was announced that the All India Football Federation, the national federation for football in India, and IMG-Reliance would be accepting bids for ownership of eight of nine selected cities for the upcoming Indian Super League, an eight-team franchise league modeled along the lines of the Indian Premier League cricket tournament. On 13 April 2014, it was announced that John Abraham and I-league side Shillong Lajong F.C. had won the bidding for the Guwahati-based franchise.

On 15 August 2014, during an official launch, it was announced that the name of the team would be NorthEast United FC representing the 8 north-eastern states of India. The first match for NorthEast United FC in Indian Super League was played against Kerala Blasters on 13 October 2014 at Indira Gandhi Athletic Stadium in Guwahati which was won 1–0.

Transfer

Foreign signings

Drafted domestic players

Drafted foreign players

Players and staff

Squad

Technical staff

Indian Super League

League table

Results summary

Results by round

Matches

Squad statistics

Appearances and goals

|-
|}

Goal scorers

Disciplinary record

See also
List of NorthEast United FC seasons

References

NorthEast United FC seasons
NorthEast United FC